Lifechangers was an American half-hour daytime show hosted by Drew Pinsky. It premiered on September 19, 2011, as part of The CW Daytime.

Overview
The show featured Drew Pinsky and a panel of experts including celebrities and doctors, helping ordinary people who are dealing with conflicts in their lives, which could include relationship or addiction issues.

Development
It was announced in April 2011 that The CW had ordered Lifechangers to series. The show aired on weekdays at 3:00 ET/2:00 CT on The CW stations as part of The CW Daytime block, replacing The Tyra Banks Show repeats which aired during the 2010–2011 television season. An original episode aired in the first half-hour and an encore telecast in the second one. It was announced on August 4, 2011 that Maria Menounos will have on-air duties on the show.

Production
Lifechangers was produced by Warner Bros.' Telepictures Productions. Drew Pinsky served as executive producer alongside Lisa Gregorisch-Dempsey, who also created the series, and Howard Lapides. It was announced in March that former The Tyra Banks Show producer Rachel Miskowiec will co-produce.

Cancellation
The program stopped airing new episodes in May and was replaced on September 17, 2012 by Tribune Broadcasting/ITV Studios's The Bill Cunningham Show.

References

External links 
 

2011 American television series debuts
2012 American television series endings
2010s American television talk shows
English-language television shows
The CW original programming
Television series by Warner Bros. Television Studios
Television series by Telepictures